Wrath is the sixth studio album by American heavy metal band Lamb of God. It was internationally released on February 23, 2009  via Roadrunner Records in Europe, Japan and Australia, and on February 24, 2009 via Epic Records in the U.S and Canada. It peaked at number 2 on the Billboard 200, becoming the band's most successful album on the chart, and sold 68,000 units in the U.S. during its first week of release. As of 2010, it has sold over 202,000 copies in the United States.

Background and production
In August, 2008, it was announced that the band had commenced work on the follow-up to Sacrament, and that it was expected to be released on February 24, 2009. Josh Wilbur was confirmed as the producer for the album. Wilbur takes the place of the band's previous producer, Machine, who worked with them on Ashes of the Wake and Sacrament.

The recording process of Wrath was made available for online viewing through the band's website, with two webcams installed in the studio (specifically in the drum room and mixing room).

A producer version of the album with 4 separate stems per song (vocals, guitars, bass, drums) is available on the bonus CD on the Limited Deluxe Edition of Wrath.

Music and album direction
Speaking about the record, drummer Chris Adler stated:

"This album is going to surprise a lot of people. Typically bands that get to where we are in our career begin to slack off, smell the roses and regurgitate. We chose a different path. No one wants to hear another band member hyping a new record. Wrath needs no hype. We have topped ourselves and on February 24 (as 2009) you will feel it." 

"We are excited to be changing things up this time and working with Josh. We've never stayed in one place too long, and the band's evolution continues. There is an aggressive shift in the material and our approach. The bar has been raised."

Guitarist Mark Morton was also quoted in an interview stating:

"We usually try to do something fresh every time. This one, I think, is deliberately a little more raw and more aggressive than Sacrament was. Sacrament was a really, really dynamic record on every level, and the songs were all over the place - it was also heavily produced. This one's really raw and real-sounding, from every angle, and we're celebrating imperfections on this record. We're choosing what takes stay on the record based more on their character and personality than how completely mechanically precise they are. It's more about vibe and attitude in the takes than it is about, 'Wow, that was perfect.' It's the perfect ones that get thrown away, because they're just too sterile."

"The guitar tones are a little cleaner than normal. We're kind of getting into this mind-set that clean is heavy. Clarity is a lot heavier than oversaturated. It's just real raw and natural and organic-sounding, which, in itself, is kind of revolutionary these days, when kids are making pro audio-sounding recordings in their dorm rooms, on their laptops, and cutting and pasting verses and choruses. It's no longer cutting edge to make a completely space-aged, robotic-sounding record. I think it's almost fresh now to make one that sounds like an actual band played it. Don't get me wrong - it still sounds airtight and rehearsed, because it is all those things. But it's just real."

Reception

Initial critical response to Wrath was positive. At Metacritic, which assigns a normalized rating out of 100 to reviews from mainstream critics, the album has received an average score of 74, based on 14 reviews. The Los Angeles Times stated that Lamb of God "roots its best songs in a Motörhead swagger that makes the growly moments stickier and gives the stadium-sized choruses a hint of righteous evil." IGN gave it an 8 out of 10 and stated that the album's highlight is "the band's technical prowess, which is omnipresent. And Blythe leads the charge valiantly, with a passel of angry proclamations. While Lamb of God doesn't exactly reinvent the wheel this time out, this is an impressive album-meaning it should be taken as a whole, cohesive listening experience. That's the best way of soaking up all the nuances and subtleties that make Lamb of God a standout American-metal band." Spin gave it a six out of ten and stated: "The latest outburst of controlled aggression from these veteran Virginia metallurgists proves that consistency is a blessing and a curse.  As always, the palm-muted jackhammer riffs and Randy Blythe's elastic denunciations of liars, hypocrites, and lying hypocrites are frightfully precise. [...] But primally satisfying as it is, the band's meat-and-taters thrash leaves one hungry for some Mastodon-style lateral thinking.  Or not.
 
AllMusic has given it mixed comments, stating: "There's no denying the sheer "angry basement workout/summer garage weightlifting" potential that Wrath'''s perfectly acceptable 45-minute running time offers, but without a single hook that sticks around long enough to reel in the fish, all you've got is bait." Rolling Stone also gave a negative review on it, saying, "the fearsome fivesome opt for a somewhat varied but hardly visionary attack mode, occasionally lurching into a groove or tune.  The song titles betray a cynicism over military and religious affairs, but growl-to-screech front-monster Randy Blythe never makes his anger coherent [...] Wrath'' opens and closes with spans of placid subtlety - a welcome touch that doesn't make up for all the raging roteness in between.

Awards
In 2010, Lamb of God was nominated for a Grammy, at the 52nd Grammy Awards, for "Set To Fail" in the Best Metal Performance category, but lost out to Judas Priest's "Dissident Aggressor". In 2011, the band was nominated for a Grammy, at the 53rd Grammy Awards, for "In Your Words" in the Best Metal Performance category, but lost to Iron Maiden's "El Dorado".

The album won Best Album at the 2009 Metal Hammer Golden Gods Awards ceremony.

Track listing

Personnel

Lamb of God
Chris Adler – drums
Willie Adler – rhythm guitar
Randy Blythe – vocals
Mark Morton – lead guitar
John Campbell – bass guitar

Additional personnel
Produced and mixed by Josh Wilbur
Engineered by Dave Holdredge, Paul Saurez
Mastered by Brian Gardner

Charts

References

2009 albums
Lamb of God (band) albums
Roadrunner Records albums
Epic Records albums